Quitman/Near Northside is a light rail station on the METRORail Red Line in Houston, Texas, United States. It opened as part of the Red Line extension on December 21, 2013.

Bus connections
66 Quitman

METRORail stations
Railway stations in the United States opened in 2013
Railway stations in Harris County, Texas